|-style="background:#E9E9E9;"
! colspan="2" style="text-align:left;" |Parties
!Votes
!%
!+/-
!Seats
!+/-
|-
| style="background-color: " |
| style="text-align:left;" | Christian Democratic Union
| 570,174	
| 44.4%
| +0.5%
| 63
| -6
|-
| width=5px style="background-color: " |
| style="text-align:left;" | Social Democratic Party of Germany
| 548,060
| 42.7%
| +0.1%
| 61
| -6
|-
| style="background-color: " |
| style="text-align:left;" | Free Democratic Party
| 103,609	
| 8.1%
| +1.0%
| 11
| -
|-
| style="background-color: " |
| style="text-align:left;" | Alternative List
| 47,642
| 3.7%
| +3.7%
| 0
| 
|-
| style="background-color: " |
| style="text-align:left;" | Socialist Unity Party of West Berlin
| 13,744
| 1.1%
| -0.7%
| 0
| 
|-
| style="background-color: " |
| style="text-align:left;" | Communist League of West Germany
| 1,367
| 0.1%
| ±0.0%
| 0
| 
|- style="background:#E9E9E9;"
! colspan="2" style="text-align:left;" |Total
! style="text-align:center;" | 1,310,553	
! style="text-align:center;" colspan="2"| 100%
! style="text-align:center;" | 135
! style="text-align:center;" | -12
|-
|colspan=7|Source
|}

State election, 1979
1979 elections in Germany